Fasor or FASOR may refer to:
 Frequency addition source of optical radiation
 Forward Air Spring Operated Return, a part of a paintball gun

See also:
Phase (disambiguation)
Phaser (disambiguation)
Phasor (disambiguation)